National College, formerly National College of Business & Technology and also formerly National Business College, is a college operating in the southeastern and east-central United States.  It was formerly accredited by the Accrediting Council for Independent Colleges and Schools.

In 2012, National enrolled about 10,000 students at 30 campuses in Virginia, Kentucky, Tennessee, Ohio, Indiana, and West Virginia.  The various campuses award credentials ranging from vocational certificates to the Master of Business Administration degree.  Subjects taught include accounting, medical transcription, coding and assisting, pharmacy, paralegal, various computer disciplines, hospitality and tourism, broadcasting technology, and emergency medicine technology.

The institution began in 1886 in Roanoke, Virginia, where the home campus remains today.  It was originally known as National Business College, and later merged with two Kentucky career colleges, Kentucky College of Business and Fugazzi College.  During 2006 it was also recognized by the Better Business Bureau as a finalist for the Torch Award for Marketplace Ethics.  In 2012, National College President Frank Longaker received the Lifetime Achievement Award from the Imagine America Foundation, honoring his 40 years of service to the career college sector.

The majority of National students receive some form of student assistance, usually in the form of federal student loans, although some scholarship and grant monies are also awarded.  Particular stress is placed on preparing students to effectively enter the workplace, and most faculty are practicing professionals in their fields.  Working adults wishing to further their education are also accommodated with evening and weekend class schedules.

In mid-2006, the institution announced a transition to the shorter name of simply National College.

In 2013, Virginia and West Virginia campuses changed their name to American National University.

Accreditation

The Roanoke Valley Campus of National College was formerly accredited by the Accrediting Council for Independent Colleges and Schools to award master's degrees, bachelor's degrees, associate degrees, and diplomas. The Louisville, Bristol, Danville (VA), Lynchburg, Harrisonburg, Lexington, Indianapolis, Parkersburg and Princeton Campuses were formerly accredited by the Accrediting Council for Independent Colleges and Schools to award bachelor's degrees, associate degrees, and diplomas. All other campuses of National College were formerly accredited by the Accrediting Council for Independent Colleges and Schools to award associate degrees and diplomas.

References

External links
 National College

For-profit universities and colleges in the United States
Educational institutions established in 1886
1886 establishments in Virginia